Lancaster is a ghost town north of Catalina, also known as Lance Cove. The community was largely depopulated (to Spillars Cove) in the late 1960s, and was not reported in the census after 1966.

See also
List of communities in Newfoundland and Labrador

Ghost towns in Newfoundland and Labrador